Austria competed at the 2002 Winter Paralympics in Salt Lake City, United States. 22 competitors from Austria won 29 medals including 9 gold, 10 silver and 10 bronze and finished 4th in the medal table.

See also 
 Austria at the Paralympics
 Austria at the 2002 Winter Olympics

References 

Austria at the Paralympics
2002 in Austrian sport
Nations at the 2002 Winter Paralympics